RFA Salviola (A502) was a British salvage vessel of the Royal Fleet Auxiliary.

Built by Wm. Simons & Co Ltd., of Renfrew, she was launched on 9 July 1945, commissioned on 25 July 1945, and decommissioned in November 1958. The ship was sold to Turkish Navy on 28 August 1959, renamed Imroz II, and renamed Cemil Parman in 1985. The ship arrived at Aliağa for scrapping on 2 October 1992.

King Salvor-class salvage vessels
Ships built on the River Clyde
1945 ships